The Arizona State Fair is an annual state fair, held at Arizona State Fairgrounds.

It was first held in 1884, but has had various interruptions due to cotton crop failure, the Great Depression era, World War I & World War II years & the COVID-19 pandemic. From 1946 to 2019 and since 2021, the fair has been held annually. It was a territory fair before Arizona was a state.

The Arizona Exposition and State Fair (official name) is a self-supporting state agency, and receives no money from the state's General Fund. The fairgrounds serve as a host facility for a number of different tradeshows, events, and entertainment. The fairgrounds is the location for the Maricopa County Fair, the Arizona National Livestock Show, the Maricopa Home and Garden Show, and more.

The Fair typically has around 75 amusement rides, 110 food booths, and 300 commercial sales booths. The Arizona State Fair is one of the top 5 state fairs by yearly attendance in the country, drawing over a million visitors annually.

Fair patrollers include security guards, the Phoenix Police and the Maricopa County Sheriff's Office.

History

1884—1891
The origins of the Arizona State fair start in 1884, when residents of the Arizona Territory organized the Arizona Territorial Fair to provide family entertainment.  The fair was held near the banks of the Salt River, just west of Central Avenue.  Entertainment included horses, roosters, baby chicks, elephants, zebras, giraffes, ostriches, camels, hippopotamuses, lions, gazelles, tigers, rhinoceroses, sheeps, goats, sharks, pigs, cheetahs, topi-antelopes, hens, cats and dogs, apes, monkeys, pony and mule races, while agriculture, cattle (dairy and beef) and home economics were the common exhibits.

The Territorial Fair continued annually at this location until 1891 when the Salt River flooded and wiped out the buildings and racetracks.

1892–1960
George Nicholas Goodman, multi-term mayor of Mesa, Arizona, was appointed executive secretary of the Arizona State Fair Commission in 1956 at an annual salary of $8,400. Executive secretary was the highest role and today the title would be president. Goodman died unexpectedly in 1959 while in office. Goodman's appointment came after each of the two immediate proceeding executive secretaries resigned, one holding the office for only two weeks. Both of those men were compensated $1,800 a year more than Goodman.

Since 1961
In 2018 the Arizona State Governor's Office did a formal review of the future of the grounds and buildings of the Arizona State Fair.

2020 saw the COVID-19 pandemic as grounds for cancellation. It was the first cancellation in 75 years. The fair did resume the next year.

Historic structures

References

External links
 Official Arizona State Fair website

State fairs
Events in Phoenix, Arizona
Culture of Phoenix, Arizona
Tourist attractions in Phoenix, Arizona
Festivals established in 1884
1884 establishments in Arizona Territory